Christian Ernst Stölzel (10 February 1792, Dresden - 4 April 1837, Dresden) was a German painter, etcher and engraver.

Biography 

At the age of sixteen, he decided that he too would become an engraver. He also spent many evenings in self-study at the Skulpturensammlung.

A serious illness, from 1812 to 1813, prevented him from pursuing his career. No sooner had he recovered, than he found himself conscripted for the Befreiungskriege against Napoleon. Altogether, he lost three years to these interruptions.

In 1822, he began a journey, on foot, to Rome. During his stay there, he became an honorary member of the Accademia di Belle Arti di Roma. He returned to Dresden in 1828.

He found employment as a drawing teacher at the Dresden Academy in 1830. His notable students there included  and Georg Heinrich Busse. After his death, he was succeeded by Carl Gottlieb Peschel.

He never married, and had no known children.

Sources 
 Christian Ernst Stölzel in Neuer Nekrolog der Deutschen, #15, 1837, Part I, Weimar 1839. pg.406
Christian Ernst Stölzel in Abend-Zeitung, 1822, pg.83

External links

1792 births
1837 deaths
19th-century German painters
19th-century German male artists
German etchers
German engravers
Academic staff of the Dresden Academy of Fine Arts
Artists from Dresden